Alireza Amirghassemi  (born September 19, 1965) is the producer and presenter of the Tapesh TV channel and the producer of concerts of Iranian singers in Los Angeles. In October 1989, he launched the Tapesh TV (PBC) channel with Massoud Jamali.

Biography 
Alireza Amirghassemi was born on September 19, 1965, in Tehran. At the age of 13, he left Iran and emigrated to the United Kingdom, where he spent a short time. In 1978, he moved to the United States and started studying at Mira Mesa high school in San Diego, California. From his early childhood in Iran his passion towards films and music was well noticed by all his family members and friends and at the age of 13 he won best playwriter among in Tehran and was awarded by the city councils and one of the legendary fathers of Iran's theater industry, Sadegh Bahrami.

After finishing high school, Alireza continued his education by attending the University of California, Los Angeles College of Film, where he learned westernized film making and started making music videos, music albums and TV programs while attending college. He started his career at the age of 19, by producing an album called Neighbors (Hamsayeh Haa) sung by Siavash Shams, which became one of the most successful albums of that year. He is the founder of Tapash TV and T2. He is one the most influential faces in Persian entertainment, and is known as the "king of Iranian entertainment". He has been involved in numerous fields of entertainment as a film and television director, producer, host and executive producer and the founder of Tapesh television network. He has performed over 1000 events and concerts worldwide in the past 40 years. He is one the most influential individuals in the modern era of Persian entertainment for the past four decades. He has been credited for innovating and revolutionizing Iranian music videos as well as one of the pioneers to preserve old Persian music.

Margins 
Recently, an Iranian film was shown in the United States for Iranians living in the United States, the subject of movie was about supported the IRGC. Opponents of the Islamic Republic of Iran clashed with the film's actors at the time of its release. Alireza Amirghasemi supported the actors who played in the film and caused the protesting people to attack his personal page on Instagram and Facebook.

References

External links 
 

Living people
American television producers
Iranian emigrants to the United States
American television hosts
1965 births